She is an 2020 Indian crime drama streaming television series created and written by Imtiaz Ali and Divya Johry. Directed by Arif Ali and Avinash Das under production house Window Seat Films, the series stars Aaditi Pohankar, Vijay Varma and Kishore. It follows the story of a female constable who goes undercover to bust an underworld gang. She premiered on Netflix on 20 March 2020.

Plot
She follows the story of a poor female constable in the Indian Police Force who has been inducted in the Anti Narcotics Group to fight a major drug lord. As a part of the mission, Bhumika goes undercover as a prostitute in Mumbai city. Meanwhile, at home, Bhumika has to fight off her drunk husband and work on finalizing her divorce with him. She is the sole earning person of her family, with her mother battling an illness and her sister studying in college. The show depicts the idea that a woman’s body can work well to control her surroundings.

Bhumika aka Bhumi is constantly struggling in her own thoughts living the moments over and over again. Sasya is captured with help of Bhumi and agrees to co-operate and become police informer but her has only one condition that he would provide information only to Bhumi. Before arresting Sasya, he and Bhumi have a brief intimate encounter where she enjoys it and re-lives that moment over and over again.

Cast
Aaditi Pohankar as Bhumika Pardeshi
Vijay Varma as Sasya
Kishore Kumar G as Nayak
Vishwas Kini as ACP Jason Fernandez
Saqib Ayub as Hemant
Resh Lamba as Durga
Vishesh Sagar as Kartik
Sandeep Sridhar Dhabale
Paritosh Sand as DCP Shishir Mathur
Shivani Rangole as Rupa
Ravish Desai
Monika Dabade as Lawyer
Suhita Thatte as Bhumika's Mother
Sandeep Dhabale as Lokhande
Dhruv Thukral as Deep
Mohammad Ali Baig as ACP Alam

Episodes

Series Overview

Season 1 (2020)

Season 2 (2022)

Controversy
In Season 2 Episode 1, the series portrays a character by the name of Ismail as the owner of a prostitution cartel dressed in the traditional attire specific to the Dawoodi Bohra community.

Critical reception
Swetha Ramakrishnan from Firstpost gave credit to the cinematography of the series and applauded the cast performances. However, she further mentioned how and why she was disappointed with Imtiaz Ali on the plot. Hindustan Times termed the series as sleazy and sloppy but hailed few instances from the series.

Scroll.in appreciated the performance of Vijay Verma and highlighted that his character who was used to setup the events in the series was eventually sidelined at the end, which was disheartening.

References

External links

Hindi-language Netflix original programming
Indian television series distributed by Netflix
2020 Indian television series debuts
Indian crime television series
Law enforcement in fiction